Above the Fall of Man is the first EP by American metalcore band Unearth, released in May 1999. The entire EP appears on their 2005 compilation album Our Days of Eulogy.

Track listing

Credits
Trevor – vocals
Buz – guitar
Ken – guitar
Rover – bass
Mike – drums

References

Unearth albums
1999 EPs